Drasteria mirifica is a moth of the family Erebidae. It is found in North America, including Nevada, Oregon and California.

The wingspan is about 30 mm.

Subspecies
Drasteria mirifica mirifica
Drasteria mirifica klotsi Richards, 1939

References

External links

Drasteria
Moths described in 1878
Moths of North America